Javornik, derived from the word "javor" meaning "maple" in Slavic languages, may refer to:

Bosnia and Herzegovina
Javornik, Vareš, a village in the Municipality of Vareš

Croatia
Javornik, Croatia, a village located on the river Una, near the town of Dvor, Croatia

Slovenia
Javornik, Idrija, a village in the Municipality of Idrija, western Slovenia
Javornik, Kranj, a village in the City Municipality of Kranj, northwestern Slovenia
Javornik, Štore, a village in the Municipality of Štore, eastern Slovenia
Slovenski Javornik, commonly known as "Javornik", a village on the river Sava, near the town of Jesenice, Slovenia

People with the surname
Helena Javornik, a Slovenian long-distance runner

See also
Javorník (disambiguation) (Czech form, with a diacritic í)
Jawornik (disambiguation)
Jaworznik
Javor (disambiguation)